The Power and the Glory is the sixth album by the British progressive rock group Gentle Giant, released in 1974. Contrary to popular belief, the title of the album and its many lyrical themes were not inspired by author Graham Greene's novel of the same name, although Derek Shulman was aware of Greene's novel. Guitarist Gary Green has cited this album as his favourite by the band.

The cover art depicting a King of Spade is from an actual old playing card from deck "Prinz-Karte-402" made Circa 1926-1933 by the German playing card company Bernhard Dondorf Gm.b.H.

A loose concept was hatched for the album prior to recording. "At the time, the Watergate scandal was happening," recalls Derek. "The Cold War issues were coming to a head. The concept for the album was based on the corruption of power and how people on the bottom are affected by the people on top. Money and power will win no matter what and the people that are hoping for the best won’t usually get the best. The label we were on at that time, WWA, was an imprint of Vertigo. Vertigo was a fully owned company of Phonogram which is Polygram which is now Universal which will probably be GE in a week which is going to be the government soon enough. So there’s the corruption of power right there! The power and the glory! Again! Still to this day!"

Releases
The album was originally released in the US and Canada by Capitol Records, as would all Gentle Giant's albums until Civilian.  The original LP cover was diecut, with rounded upper corners.

In a 2010 interview Derek Shulman announced that the band are working at creating an animated film based around the themes, characters and songs of the album. The animations subsequently became available in the album's Blu-ray release, of July 2014, which also features a remix (both in stereo and 5.1 surround format) by Steven Wilson. The new edition was released by Alucard, the company that managed Gentle Giant material.

Track listing

Personnel
Gentle Giant
 Gary Green – electric guitar (tracks 1, 2, 4, 5, 6, 7, 8), acoustic guitar (tracks 3, 4, 6), vocals (tracks 1, 6, 8)
 Kerry Minnear – Hammond organ (tracks 1, 2, 4, 5, 6, 8), piano (tracks 1, 2, 5, 6, 7,8), RMI Electra-Piano (1,4), Fender Rhodes (1), Minimoog (tracks 2, 4, 5, 8), Clavinet (tracks 2, 4, 6, 7, 10), Wurlitzer (tracks 1, 3, 4), marimba (track 4), vibraphone (track 6), cello (track 2), lead vocals on tracks 2-4
 Derek Shulman – lead vocals on tracks 1, 2 and 4-8, tenor saxophone (track 2)
 Ray Shulman – bass guitar, violin (tracks 2, 4, 7), electric violin (track 7), acoustic guitar (track 6), vocals (tracks 1, 6, 8)
 John Weathers – drums, tambourine (tracks 2, 5, 7), sleigh bells (track 6), cymbals (track 1), vocals (track 6)

Charts

References

Interview with Derek Shulman, 17 February 2010, by Wayne Klein https://web.archive.org/web/20100719034532/http://www.dvdivas.net/INDEX-PROGRESSIVELAND.html
Interview with Gary Green, 12 February 2010, by Wayne Klein https://web.archive.org/web/20100719034532/http://www.dvdivas.net/INDEX-PROGRESSIVELAND.html

Gentle Giant albums
1974 albums
Vertigo Records albums
Capitol Records albums
Concept albums